Ravanna is a census-designated place in Mercer County, Missouri, United States. It is located approximately seven miles northeast of Princeton on U.S. Route 136. The population was 60 at the 2020 census.

Ravanna was platted in 1857. A variant name was "Sonoma". A post office called Sonoma was established in 1855, the name was changed to Ravanna in 1858, and the post office closed in 1975. The present name most likely is a transfer from Ravenna, Ohio.

Demographics

Education
The northern half is in the North Mercer School District, including the main townsite, while other parts are in the Princeton R-5 School District. The community was previously part of the Ravanna R-IV School District until the school closed in 1977 due to financial problems. Ravanna's mascot was the Ranger.

References

Unincorporated communities in Mercer County, Missouri
Unincorporated communities in Missouri